Ronald Ross Howell (14 November 1919 – 7 March 2015) was an Australian rules footballer who played with North Melbourne in the Victorian Football League (VFL).

Notes

External links 

1919 births
Australian rules footballers from Victoria (Australia)
North Melbourne Football Club players
2015 deaths